The Convention for Limiting the Manufacture and Regulating the Distribution of Narcotic Drugs was a drug control treaty promulgated in Geneva on 13 July 1931 that entered into force on 9 July 1933.

History 
The conference was held in Geneva on or about 27 May 1931.

After World War II, the 1931 convention's scope was broadened considerably by the 1948 Protocol Bringing under International Control Drugs outside the Scope of the Convention of 13 July 1931 for Limiting the Manufacture and Regulating the Distribution of Narcotic Drugs. In 1968, the Convention was superseded by the 1961 Single Convention on Narcotic Drugs, as it entered into force.

Overview

Schedules 
It established two groups of drugs.

Group I consisted of:
Sub-group (a), which consisted of:
Morphine and its salts, including its ester salts like morphine diacetate (heroin) and preparations made directly from raw or medicinal opium and containing more than 20 percent of morphine;
Cocaine and its salts, including preparations made direct from the coca leaf and containing more than 0.1 percent of cocaine, all the esters of ecgonine and their salts;
Dihydrohydrooxycodeinone (of which the substance registered under the name of eucodal is a salt), dihydrocodeinone (of which the substance registered under the name of dicodide is a salt), dihydromorphinone (of which the substance registered under the name of dilaudide is a salt), acetyldihydrocodeinone or acetyldemethylodihydrothebaine (of which the substance registered under the name of acedicone is a salt); dihydromorphine (of which the substance registered under the name of paramorfan is a salt), their esters and the salts of any of these substances and of their esters, morphine-N-oxide (registered trade name genomorphine), also the morphine-N-oxide derivatives, and the other pentavalent nitrogen morphine derivatives.
Sub-group (b), which consisted of:
Ecgonine, thebaine and their salts, benzylmorphine and the other ethers of morphine and their salts, except methylmorphine (codeine), ethylmorphine and their salts.

Group II consisted of:
Methylmorphine (codeine), ethylmorphine and their salts.

Group I was subject to stricter regulations than Group II. For instance, in estimating the amount of drugs needed for medical and scientific needs, the margin allowed for demand fluctuations was wider for Group II drugs than for Group I drugs. Also, in certain reports, a summary statement would be sufficient for matters related to Group II drugs. The establishment of these rudimentary groups foreshadowed the development of the drug scheduling system that exists today. Both the 1961 Single Convention on Narcotic Drugs and the 1971 Convention on Psychotropic Substances have schedules of controlled substances. The 1988 United Nations Convention Against Illicit Traffic in Narcotic Drugs and Psychotropic Substances has two tables of controlled precursor chemicals.

Drug Supervisory Body 
The Drug Supervisory Body (sometimes called "Opium Supersiory Body", and in French "Organe de Contrôle") was established under the 1931 Convention to compile estimates of the amount of drugs to be consumed, manufactured, converted, exported, imported, or used by each country. 

One member of the Body was nominated by the Office international d'hygiène publique (general health advisory council of the League of Nations' Health Organization).

The Body should not be confused with the Permanent Central Opium Board established under the 1925 Opium Convention, although both the Body and the Board were merged onto the International Narcotics Control Board when the Single Convention on Narcotic Drugs entered into force in 1968.

References

External links
 
 
 Ratification status

Drug control treaties
League of Nations treaties
Treaties concluded in 1931
Treaties entered into force in 1933
Treaties of the Kingdom of Afghanistan
Treaties of the Albanian Kingdom (1928–1939)
Treaties of the United States
Treaties of Saudi Arabia
Treaties of Argentina
Treaties of the First Austrian Republic
Treaties of Belgium
Treaties of Vargas-era Brazil
Treaties of the United Kingdom
Treaties of Canada
Treaties of Australia
Treaties of New Zealand
Treaties of the Union of South Africa
Treaties of the Irish Free State
Treaties of British India
Treaties of the Kingdom of Bulgaria
Treaties of the Republic of China (1912–1949)
Treaties of Colombia
Treaties of Chile
Treaties of Costa Rica
Treaties of Cuba
Treaties of Czechoslovakia
Treaties of Denmark
Treaties of the Dominican Republic
Treaties of Ecuador
Treaties of the Kingdom of Egypt
Treaties of Estonia
Treaties of Finland
Treaties of the French Third Republic
Treaties of Nazi Germany
Treaties of the Second Hellenic Republic
Treaties of Guatemala
Treaties of Haiti
Treaties of Honduras
Treaties of the Kingdom of Hungary (1920–1946)
Treaties of Pahlavi Iran
Treaties of the Kingdom of Italy (1861–1946)
Treaties of the Empire of Japan
Treaties of the Kingdom of Iraq
Treaties of Latvia
Treaties of Lithuania
Treaties of Liechtenstein
Treaties of Luxembourg
Treaties of Mexico
Treaties of Monaco
Treaties of the Netherlands
Treaties of Nicaragua
Treaties of Norway
Treaties of Panama
Treaties of Paraguay
Treaties of Peru
Treaties of the Second Polish Republic
Treaties of the Ditadura Nacional
Treaties of the Kingdom of Romania
Treaties of El Salvador
Treaties of San Marino
Treaties of the Second Spanish Republic
Treaties extended to Anglo-Egyptian Sudan
Treaties of Sweden
Treaties of Switzerland
Treaties of Turkey
Treaties of Venezuela
Treaties of the Soviet Union
Treaties of the Bahamas
Treaties of the Czech Republic
Treaties of Slovakia
Treaties of Fiji
Treaties of Papua New Guinea
Treaties of Zimbabwe
1931 in Switzerland
Treaties extended to Curaçao and Dependencies
Treaties extended to Surinam (Dutch colony)
Treaties extended to the Dutch East Indies
Treaties extended to the Belgian Congo
Treaties extended to Ruanda-Urundi
Treaties extended to British Honduras
Treaties extended to British Ceylon
Treaties extended to the British Solomon Islands
Treaties extended to British Cyprus
Treaties extended to the Falkland Islands
Treaties extended to the Gambia Colony and Protectorate
Treaties extended to Gibraltar
Treaties extended to the Gold Coast (British colony)
Treaties extended to British Kenya
Treaties extended to the British Leeward Islands
Treaties extended to British Dominica
Treaties extended to British Mauritius
Treaties extended to the Colony and Protectorate of Nigeria
Treaties extended to the Colony of North Borneo
Treaties extended to Northern Rhodesia
Treaties extended to Nyasaland
Treaties extended to the Colony of Sarawak
Treaties extended to the Crown Colony of Seychelles
Treaties extended to the Colony of Sierra Leone
Treaties extended to British Somaliland
Treaties extended to the Straits Settlements
Treaties extended to Tanganyika (territory)
Treaties extended to the Kingdom of Tonga (1900–1970)
Treaties extended to the Crown Colony of Trinidad and Tobago
Treaties extended to the Uganda Protectorate
Treaties extended to the Sultanate of Zanzibar
Treaties extended to Southern Rhodesia
Treaties extended to the Colony of Barbados
Treaties extended to British Guiana
Treaties extended to the Colony of Fiji
Treaties extended to the Federated Malay States
Treaties extended to the Unfederated Malay States
Treaties extended to Mandatory Palestine
Treaties extended to Saint Helena, Ascension and Tristan da Cunha
Treaties extended to the Emirate of Transjordan
Treaties extended to the British Windward Islands
Treaties extended to British Burma
Treaties extended to the Dominion of Newfoundland
Treaties extended to Norfolk Island
Treaties extended to the Nauru Trust Territory
Treaties extended to the Territory of New Guinea
Treaties extended to the Territory of Papua
Treaties extended to the Faroe Islands
Treaties extended to Greenland
Treaties extended to British Hong Kong
Treaties extended to British Cameroon
Treaties extended to British Togoland